This is a list of foreign players in the TT Pro League that began league play in 1999. The following players must meet both of the following two criteria:
 Have played at least one TT Pro League game. Players who were signed by Pro League clubs, but only played in lower league, cup and/or international matches, or did not play in any competitive games at all, are not included.
 Are considered foreign, i.e., outside Trinidad and Tobago, if he is not eligible to play for the Trinidad and Tobago national team.

More specifically,
 If a player has been capped on international level, the national team is used; if he has been capped by more than one country, the highest level (or the most recent) team is used. These include Trinidad and Tobago players with dual citizenship.
 If a player has not been capped on international level, his country of birth is used, except those who were born abroad from Trinidad and Tobago parents or moved to Trinidad and Tobago at a young age, and those who clearly indicated to have switched his nationality to another nation.

Clubs listed are those for which the player has played at least one Pro League game and seasons for those in which the player has played at least one Pro League game. Note that seasons, not calendar years, are used. For example, "2010–13" indicates that the player has played in every season from 2010–11 to 2012–13, but not necessarily every calendar year from 2010 to 2013. Therefore, a player beginning with the 2010–11 season should always have a listing under at least two years — for instance, a player making his debut in 2011, during the 2011–12 season, will have "2011–12" after his name.

In bold: Players who have played at least one Pro League game in the current season (2013–14), and the clubs they've played for. They include players who have subsequently left the club, but do not include current players of a Pro League club who have not played a Pro League game in the current season.

Details correct as of end of 2013–14 season. Next update will remove all players from withdrawn teams and that have left their clubs from Bold status, and add newly admitted teams' players. This will be undertaken on the first day of the 2014–15 season in September 2014.



Antigua and Barbuda
 Marcus Ambrose – Morvant Caledonia United – 2009
 Peter Byers – San Juan Jabloteh, Central FC – 2007–08, 2012–13
 Ranjae Christian – Joe Public – 2000
 George Dublin – Joe Public, Tobago United – 2002–08
 Gayson Gregory – San Juan Jabloteh, Joe Public – 2001–03, 2006, 2008, 2010–11
 Akeem Thomas – Morvant Caledonia United – 2012–14
 Elvis Thomas – Morvant Caledonia United – 2012–13
 Vashami Allen - Central FC - 2016-17

Bahamas
 Happy Hall – Ma Pau – 2009

Barbados
 Ranaldo Bailey – Morvant Caledonia United – 2015–
 Roger Proverbs – Doc's Khelwalaas – 2000

Belize
 Mark Leslie – Ma Pau, North East Stars – 2004, 2006, 2008–11

Botswana
 Mogogi Gabonamong – Arima Fire, Morvant Caledonia United – 2004–05
 Kagiso Tshelametsi – Arima Fire, Morvant Caledonia United – 2004–05

Brazil
 Fabiano Agripino – W Connection – 2000
 Christian Almas – W Connection – 2000, 2006
 João Ananias – W Connection – 2013–14
 Rafel Goncalves Assuscas de Andrade – W Connection – 2000
 Renato Lucas Leite Ferreira de Araujo – W Connection – 2000
 Joao Paulo Santana Bezzera – Ma Pau – 2008
 Luciano Rodrigues Carreto – W Connection – 2000
 Douglas da Costa – W Connection – 2007–08
 Vincente da Costa – Joe Public – 2006
 Ricardo Severino de Oliveira – W Connection – 2003
 Célio da Silva – W Connection – 2013–14
 Danielo da Silva – W Connection – 2002
 Emerson da Silva – W Connection – 2001
 Iomar da Silva – Ma Pau – 2008
 Jorge da Silva – Joe Public – 2008
 José da Silva – W Connection – 2010–11
 Elton de Britto – Ma Pau – 2008
 Jerónimo Wendes de Sousa – North East Stars – 2011–12
 José Luiz de Sousa – W Connection – 2007
 Felinto dos Santos – W Connection – 2000
 Leandro dos Santos – Ma Pau – 2008
 Waldinei dos Santos – W Connection – 2000
 Gefferson – W Connection – 2000–08
 Eduardo Guadagnucci – W Connection – 2000
 Thiago Faria – North East Stars – 2011–12
 Luis Andre Lima – United Petrotrin – 2009
 José Maria Manoel – W Connection – 2000–02
 Joao Guilherme Mansano – W Connection – 2001
 Henrique Marcussi – W Connection – 2001
 Leandro Monção – Joe Public – 2006
 Acacio Jose dos Santos Neto – W Connection – 2000 
 Francisco Neto – W Connection – 2010–11
 William Oliveira – W Connection – 2003–09
 Renato Pereira – W Connection – 2000–02, 2008–11
 Paulo Roberto – W Connection – 2000, 2010–11
 Igor de Oliviera Santos – W Connection – 2009
 Luciano Sato – W Connection – 2002
 Ronaldo Viana – W Connection, San Juan Jabloteh – 2000, 2005, 2008, 2010–11
 Jose Luciano Viera – W Connection – 2004

Canada
 Bradley Beaumont - W Connection F.C. - 2015
 Maleik de Freitas - W Connection F.C. - 2015

Colombia
 Eder Gilmar Arias – W Connection – 2008–11
 Carlos Carimchimbo – Doc's Khelwalaas – 2000
 Johnny Cardoña – St. Ann's Rangers – 2008
 Rudinei Cardoso – Joe Public – 2000
 Julio Fernandez de la Rosa – Tobago United – 2007
 Milton Espitia – North East Stars – 2008
 Alejandro Figueroa – Doc's Khelwalaas, San Juan Jabloteh, Joe Public, Ma Pau, W Connection – 1999–2011, 2012–14
 Carlos Fory – Doc's Khelwalaas – 2000
 Milton Gomez – W Connection, St. Ann's Rangers, North East Stars – 2006, 2008, 2010–11
 Carlos González – Joe Public, North East Stars – 2006–11
 Phanor González – Joe Public – 2006
 Yefer Lozano – W Connection – 2013–14
 Eduardo Moreno – Tobago United – 2009
 Camilo Ortega – W Connection – 2013–14
 Eduardo Ortiz – Tobago United – 2009
 Edgar Ospina – United Petrotrin – 2009
 Jerson Peñaranda – San Juan Jabloteh – 2000
 Yhon Reyes – W Connection – 2013–14
 Jair Saldaña – Joe Public – 2008
 Julian Martinez Sanchez – St. Ann's Rangers – 2010–11
 Wilson Sánchez – Doc's Khelwalaas – 2000
 John Seña – Doc's Khelwalaas – 2000
 Oscar Velasco – W Connection – 2008
 Christian Viveros – W Connection – 2008–14

Dominica
 Julian Wade – Morvant Caledonia United – 2013–
 Glenson Prince - San Juan Jabloteh F.C. - 2014-15
 Anfernee Frederick - W Connection F.C. - 2016

Dominican Republic
 Jonathan Faña – W Connection – 2006–09
 Miguel Lloyd – W Connection – 2008–11

England
 Luke Gullick – San Juan Jabloteh – 2011–12

Ghana

 Michael Yaw Darko - St. Ann's Rangers, Central
 Maestro Mensah - Morvant Caledonia United

Grenada
 Kithson Bain – Morvant Caledonia United – 2013–14
 Jamal Charles – W Connection – 2015–
 Ricky Charles – St. Ann's Rangers – 2008
 Kassius Ettienne – W Connection – 2008–09
 Denron Frederick – Morvant Caledonia United – 2013–14
 Shemel Louison – Morvant Caledonia United – 2012–
 Shane Rennie – St. Ann's Rangers – 2008
 Wendell Rennie – FC South End – 2010–11
 Kennedy Hinkson

Guyana
 Anthony Abrams – Joe Public, Morvant Caledonia United – 2006–07
 Brion Baker – Morvant Caledonia United – 2008–09
 Kevin Beaton – Morvant Caledonia United – 2008
 Shawn Beveney – North East Stars, Morvant Caledonia United – 2006, 2010–11
 Shawn Bishop – Morvant Caledonia United – 2005, 2007
 Dwayne Blake – Morvant Caledonia United – 2009
 Trayon Bobb – Morvant Caledonia United – 2010–13
 Akel Clarke – St. Ann's Rangers, Central FC – 2012–
 Nigel Codrington – San Juan Jabloteh, Morvant Caledonia United – 2005–09
 Devaughn Dummett – San Juan Jabloteh – 2005
 Andrew Durant – Tobago United, North East Stars – 2007–08, 2011–12
 Carey Harris – Joe Public, Tobago United, North East Stars, Central FC – 2004–14
 Jamaal Harvey – Morvant Caledonia United – 2015–
 Collie Hercules – Doc's Khelwalaas, Tobago United – 1999–2000, 2007–09
 Sheldon Holder – Morvant Caledonia United – 2011–13, 2014–
 Leslie Holligan – North East Stars, Morvant Caledonia United – 2006–07
 Selwyn Isaacs – Tobago United – 2008
 Kester Jacobs – Morvant Caledonia United – 2008–09
 Randolph Jerome – Doc's Khelwalaas, South Starworld Strikers, W Connection, Morvant Caledonia United, North East Stars – 1999–2011
 Shaun Johnson – Tobago United – 2008
 Quacy Johnson – Tobago United – 2007–08
 Pierre Joseph – Tobago United – 2008
 Tichard Joseph – Tobago United – 2008–09
 Kareem Knights – Morvant Caledonia United – 2015–
 Howard Lowe – Joe Public, North East Stars, Morvant Caledonia United – 2004–08
 Konata Mannings – Morvant Caledonia United – 2008
 Kelvin McKenzie – North East Stars – 2005, 2007–08
 Kayode McKinnon – Morvant Caledonia United, Joe Public, Tobago United, North East Stars – 2002–11
 Abassy McPherson – North East Stars, Joe Public – 2004–08
 Vurlon Mills – T&TEC, Morvant Caledonia United – 2011–13
 Walter Moore – North East Stars, Morvant Caledonia United – 2005–13
 Colin Nelson – Morvant Caledonia United – 2010–13
 Dwight Peters – Morvant Caledonia United – 2007
 Charles Pollard – Doc's Khelwalaas, W Connection, San Juan Jabloteh, Morvant Caledonia United, Joe Public, North East Stars – 2000–13
 Richard Reynolds – North East Stars, Morvant Caledonia United, Tobago United – 2004, 2007–09
 Gregory Richardson – Joe Public – 2007–08
 Pernell Schultz – Morvant Caledonia United – 2013– 
 Jermine Scott – Doc's Khelwalaas – 2000
 Jamaal Smith – Morvant Caledonia United – 2013–14
 Kelvin Smith – Tobago United, North East Stars, Central FC – 2009–13
 Travis Waterton – North East Stars – 2005–06
 Ronson Williams – Morvant Caledonia United – 2011–12

Haiti
 Pierre Richard Bruny – Joe Public – 2001–02
 Peterson Desrivieres – Joe Public – 2008
 Gabriel Michel – W Connection – 2001
 Elusma Pierre – Joe Public – 2008
 Chrismonor Telsuma – W Connection – 2001
 Ulterguens St. Victor – Joe Public – 2008
 Fortunato Valcourt – St. Ann's Rangers – 2009–12

Honduras

Jamaica
 Nicholas Addlery – South Starworld Strikers, San Juan Jabloteh – 2003–05
 Jacomeno Barrett – Joe Public – 2007–08
 Oneke Ford – Morvant Caledonia United, North East Stars – 2005–06
 Sean Fraser – North East Stars – 2010–11
 Leon Gordon – North East Stars – 2011–12
 Kevin Graham – Morvant Caledonia United – 2009–12, 2013–14
 Christopher Harvey – W Connection, Joe Public – 2004–06, 2008
 Lamar Hodges – Joe Public – 2010–11
 Jermaine Hue – W Connection – 2004
 Keith Kelly – San Juan Jabloteh – 2005
 Kevin Lamey – Joe Public – 2007
 Shane Mattis – Ma Pau, St. Ann's Rangers, Central FC, San Juan Jabloteh – 2008–14
 Kimarley McDonald – North East Stars – 2010–11
 Adrian Mitchell – Joe Public – 2006
 Akeno Morgan – North East Stars, Ma Pau, Tobago United – 2006, 2008–09
 Roen Nelson – Joe Public – 2006–08
 Lovel Palmer – W Connection – 2004
 Toric Robinson – Central FC – 2013–14
 Tyrone Sawyers – Joe Public – 2006
 Robert Scarlett – W Connection – 2004
 Keithy Simpson – North East Stars – 2012–14
 Carlington Smith – Joe Public – 2006
 Donovan Thomas – Joe Public, Morvant Caledonia United – 1999–2000
 O'Neil Thompson – W Connection – 2004
 Denzil Watson – Joe Public – 2005
 Wolry Wolfe – Joe Public – 2006, 2008

Italy

 Mirko D'Elia - W Connection F.C. - 2013-14

Japan
 Yu Hoshide – Joe Public – 2009–11

Liberia

 Borfor Carr - Central

Nigeria
 Abdullahi Aminu – Tobago United – 2005, 2007
 Aminu Erilme – Tobago United – 2005
 Chukuldi Odita – Joe Public – 1999
 Christian Okonkwo – North East Stars – 2007
 Samsideen Olutunji Quadri – Tobago United – 2005, 2007
 Eugene Onuorah – Joe Public – 1999
 Iyaka Okechekwu Stanley – W Connection, South Starworld Strikers – 2005–06

Panama

 Paolo De La Guardia - W Connection F.C. - 2016

Puerto Rico
 Andrés Cabrero – North East Stars – 2013–14

Saint Kitts and Nevis
 Julani Archibald – W Connection – 2013–
 Seretse Cannonier – San Juan Jabloteh – 2000
 Devaughn Elliott – W Connection – 2013–
 Ordell Flemming – Morvant Caledonia United – 2015–
 Keith Gumbs – San Juan Jabloteh – 2000–01
 Floyd Hodge – Tobago United – 2003–05
 Mudassa Howe – San Juan Jabloteh – 2013–14
 George Isaac – Morvant Caledonia United, W Connection – 2000, 2003–07
 Kennedy Isles – Morvant Caledonia United – 2015–
 Ian Lake – Tobago United – 2003–05
 Allister Warner – Tobago United – 2003–05
 Gerard Williams – W Connection – 2008–

Saint Lucia
 Vernus Abbott – Morvant Caledonia United – 2005, 2008
 Titus Elva – W Connection, Morvant Caledonia United – 1999–2005
 Jean-Marie Emerson – Morvant Caledonia United – 2000
 Sheldon Emmanuel – Morvant Caledonia United – 2004–09, 2011–12
 Kurt Frederick – W Connection – 2012–
 Shervon Jack – Joe Public – 2008
 Earl Jean – W Connection, San Juan Jabloteh – 1999–2008
 Elijah Joseph – W Connection – 1999–2013
 Valencius Joseph – W Connection, Morvant Caledonia United – 2000, 2004–05
 Francis Lastic – W Connection – 1999–2002
 Otev Lawrence – Morvant Caledonia United – 2015–
 Emerson Sheldon Mark – W Connection – 1999–2002
 Anthony Maximin – W Connection – 1999
 Jonathan McVane – W Connection – 1999–2002
 Tremain Paul – W Connection – 2012–
 Zaine Pierre – W Connection – 2010–11, 2015–
 Gregory President – Morvant Caledonia United – 2015–
 Malik St. Prix – W Connection – 2015–
 Benner Walter – W Connection – 2002
 Pernal Williams – W Connection – 2010–11
 Alvin Xavier – W Connection – 1999–2002

Saint Vincent and the Grenadines
 Melvin Andrews – North East Stars – 2005–06
 James Chewitt – San Juan Jabloteh – 1999
 Keith James – Tobago United – 2009
 Troy Jeffers – St. Ann's Rangers – 2008
 Winslow McDowald – North East Stars – 2010–11
 Reginald Payne – Tobago United – 2009
 Durwin Ross – Tobago United – 2009
 Shandel Samuel – North East Stars, San Juan Jabloteh, Ma Pau – 2006–11
 Dwayne Sandy – Morvant Caledonia United – 2008–09
 Nical Stephens – Morvant Caledonia United – 2012–14
 Cornelius Stewart – Morvant Caledonia United – 2012–13
 Shemol Trimmingham – Morvant Caledonia United – 2012–13
 Kendall Velox – Joe Public, Morvant Caledonia United, North East Stars – 1999–2009, 2011–12

Scotland
 James Baird – Tobago United – 2007

Sierra Leone
 Alusine Bangura – W Connection – 2009
 Abdulai Conteh – W Connection – 1999
 Charlie Wright – W Connection – 1999

South Africa
 Hugh Laresevree – W Connection, Joe Public – 2001–02

South Sudan
 Ladulé Lako LoSarah – Central FC – 2012–13

Suriname
 Ronny Aloema – Tobago United – 2009
 Dimitrie Apai – W Connection – 2013–
 Stefano Rijssel–W Connection– 2012–2014
 Lorenzo Wiebers – Tobago United – 2007–09

United States
 Carlos Diaz – W Connection – 2009
 Grant Guthrie – United Petrotrin – 2008
 Steven Loverso – Tobago United – 2008
 Ralph Lundy III – Morvant Caledonia United – 2013–14<ref></ref
 Graham Smith - 2017
 Kenny Adeshigbin - Point Fortin Civic F.C. - 2016-17

Venezuela
 Alvis Faure Díaz – Arima Fire – 2002–05

See also
 List of foreign TT Pro League goalscorers
 List of TT Pro League players with international caps

Notes

External links
National Football Teams
Caribbean Football Database
Soca Warriors Online, TT Pro League

foreign
 
TT Pro League
Association football player non-biographical articles